Cnemeplatiini is a tribe of darkling beetles in the subfamily Pimeliinae of the family Tenebrionidae. There are about nine genera in Cnemeplatiini.

Genera
These genera belong to the tribe Cnemeplatiini
 Actizeta Pascoe, 1875  (Australasia)
 Alaudes Horn, 1870  (North America)
 Cnemeplatia Costa, 1847  (the Palearctic, tropical Africa, and Indomalaya)
 Durandius Kaszab, 1970  (Indomalaya)
 Lepidocnemeplatia Bousquet & Bouchard, 2018  (North America, the Neotropics, and Indomalaya)
 Philhammus Fairmaire, 1871  (the Palearctic and tropical Africa)
 Rondoniella Kaszab, 1970  (Indomalaya)
 Thorictosoma Lea, 1919  (Australasia)
 Wattiana Matthews & Lawrence, 2005  (Australasia)

References

Further reading

 
 

Tenebrionoidea